Mysanthus uleanus is a species of flowering plant in the legume family, Fabaceae. It belongs to the subfamily Faboideae. It is the only described member of the genus Mysanthus, though there is a report of an undescribed species.

References

Phaseoleae
Monotypic Fabaceae genera